Aureliopolis in Asia is both a Roman era city and a vacant titular see located in the ecumenical province of Asia, in what is today Turkey.

City
The Roman city (also known as Frenel and Evrenli), was located on the plain of Adramyttium at 39.5583N and 27.0983E. It was on the Freneli Çay river near the modern town of Havran in Balıkesir Province of Turkey. At times minted its own coins.

Bishopric
Alfonso Uribe Jaramillo (June 1963 – April 1968)
Beniamino Nardone (Aug 1962 – Feb 1963)
Nicola Canino (1951.04.11 – 1962.05.15)

References

Towns in Turkey
Cultural history of Turkey
Populated places of the Byzantine Empire
Dioceses in Asia
Catholic titular sees in Asia
Roman towns and cities in Turkey
History of Balıkesir Province